Chris Maxwell may refer to:

 Chris Maxwell (jurist), Australian jurist
 Chris Maxwell (footballer) (born 1990), Welsh football goalkeeper